Winding Roads is a 1999 American independent drama film produced and directed by Theodore Melfi in his feature directorial debut. Melfi wrote the screenplay with his future wife, actress Kimberly Quinn, who stars in the film with Katrina Holden Bronson and Rachel Hunter. James Marsters, Adam Scott, Michael Weatherly and Carlos Gómez co-star. The story centers on three women, all best friends, navigating their respective love lives.

Winding Roads was filmed in late 1998 in Springfield, Missouri, and produced through Melfi and Quinn's company Goldenlight Films. It was screened at the 1999 Austin Film Festival, premiered in Springfield on September 14, 2000, and was later shown in theaters in the Midwest.

Cast
 Kimberly Quinn as Rene Taylor
 Katrina Holden Bronson as Sam Stafford
 Rachel Hunter as Kelly Simons
 James Marsters as Billy Johnson
 Adam Scott as Brian Calhoun
 Michael Weatherly as Mick Simons
 Carlos Gómez as Jesus

Release
Winding Roads was screened on October 8 and 10, 1999, at the sixth annual Austin Film Festival. As a means of attracting a potential distributor, a private industry screening for 450 guests was held at 20th Century Fox Studios in Hollywood on April 12, 2000.
The world premiere of Winding Roads took place on September 14, 2000, at the Wehrenberg Theatres Campbell 16 in Springfield, Missouri, where it played for the next two weeks. The film's theatrical release — including a two-week run at the GQT Forum 8 theater in Columbia, Missouri in March 2001 — was orchestrated entirely by Melfi.

The film made its cable premiere on Showtime (where it had "a long life") and the Independent Film Channel.

References

External links
 

1999 films
American independent films
American romantic drama films
1999 romantic drama films
Films directed by Theodore Melfi
Films about divorce
Films set in Missouri
Films shot in Missouri
1999 directorial debut films
1999 independent films
1990s English-language films
1990s American films